Dar Tang may refer to:

Dar Tang-e Olya
Dar Tang-e Sofla